Jens Lohmann (born 6 February 1956) is a Mexican modern pentathlete. He competed at the 1980 Summer Olympics, finishing in 36th place in the individual event.

References

External links
 

1956 births
Living people
Mexican male modern pentathletes
Olympic modern pentathletes of Mexico
Modern pentathletes at the 1980 Summer Olympics